Helmut ("Henry") Laskau (September 12, 1916 – May 7, 2000) has been called the greatest racewalker in U.S. track and field history. Born in Berlin, Germany Laskau was a top distance runner in his native Germany, before being forced to leave that country by the Nazis in 1938 due to his Jewish heritage. He moved to the United States and served in the U.S. Army during World War II, before resuming his competitive walking career in 1946.

Over two decades Laskau won 42 national titles, set the world record in the mile, was the national A.A.U champion, and was a competitor in the 1948, 1952, and 1956 Olympic Games, placing 12th in 1952 at 20 kilometers. He was a 1951 Pan-American Games champion. 

He also was a four-time gold medal winner at the Maccabiah Games in the 3,000 m race walk; in the 1950 Maccabiah Games, 1953 Maccabiah Games, 1957 Maccabiah Games, and 1965 Maccabiah Games. During an 11-year career, he set five national records and during nine years of that period was unbeaten by any American walker. Laskau won the racewalk at the 1970 Masters National Outdoor Championship in San Diego.  In 1983, he was named to the USA All-Time Track and Field team. He remained active in the sport after retiring from competition, serving as a volunteer official. Laskau died at the age of 83 in Coconut Creek, Florida, in 2000.

See also
 List of select Jewish track and field athletes

References

External links 
 Henry Laskau at the International Jewish Sports Hall of Fame
 
 
 

1916 births
2000 deaths
American male racewalkers
Athletes (track and field) at the 1948 Summer Olympics
Athletes (track and field) at the 1951 Pan American Games
Athletes (track and field) at the 1952 Summer Olympics
Athletes (track and field) at the 1956 Summer Olympics
Pan American Games gold medalists for the United States
Pan American Games medalists in athletics (track and field)
Olympic track and field athletes of the United States
Jewish emigrants from Nazi Germany to the United States
Jewish male athletes (track and field)
Athletes from Berlin
International Jewish Sports Hall of Fame inductees
Maccabiah Games gold medalists for the United States
Maccabiah Games medalists in athletics
Competitors at the 1950 Maccabiah Games
Competitors at the 1953 Maccabiah Games
Competitors at the 1957 Maccabiah Games
Competitors at the 1965 Maccabiah Games
Medalists at the 1951 Pan American Games
20th-century American Jews